Almedin Ziljkić (born 25 February 1996) is a Bosnian professional footballer who plays as a left winger for Bosnian Premier League club Sarajevo.

International career
In October 2020, Ziljkić was called-up to represent the Bosnia and Herzegovina national team, for a friendly game against Iran and for the 2020–21 UEFA Nations League games against the Netherlands and Italy. He debuted in an away loss against the Netherlands on 15 November 2020.

Career statistics

International

Honours
Borac Banja Luka
First League of RS: 2018–19
Bosnian Premier League: 2020–21

References

External links
Almedin Zilkić stats at utakmica.rs
Almedin Ziljkic at National-Football-Teams.com

1996 births
Living people
Sportspeople from Novi Pazar
Bosnia and Herzegovina footballers
Bosnia and Herzegovina international footballers
Association football wingers
Bosniaks of Serbia
Bosnia and Herzegovina expatriate footballers
Serbian SuperLiga players
First Football League (Croatia) players
Premier League of Bosnia and Herzegovina players
Slovenian PrvaLiga players
FK Donji Srem players
FK Novi Pazar players
HNK Gorica players
FK Sloboda Tuzla players
FK Tuzla City players
FK Borac Banja Luka players
NK Olimpija Ljubljana (2005) players
FK Sarajevo players
Expatriate footballers in Croatia
Bosnia and Herzegovina expatriate sportspeople in Croatia
Expatriate footballers in Slovenia
Bosnia and Herzegovina expatriate sportspeople in Slovenia